Punchline was a Japanese company that developed video games. It was founded by former Love-de-Lic employee Yoshiro Kimura. As of June 2006, the company had around 25 employees.

Games 
Chulip – (2002, PlayStation 2)
Rule of Rose – (2006, PlayStation 2)

References

External links 
  (archived from the original) 

Defunct video game companies of Japan
Video game companies established in 2002
Video game companies disestablished in 2006
Video game development companies
Japanese companies established in 2002
Japanese companies disestablished in 2006